The 2001 Turkmenistan Higher League (Ýokary Liga) season was the ninth season of Turkmenistan's professional football league. Nine teams competed in 2001.

Results

References

Ýokary Liga seasons
Turk
Turk
1